The fourth and final season of the American television series Raising Hope premiered on November 15, 2013, on Fox. The program moved to a new time slot this season, airing on Friday at 9:00 pm ET followed by the comedy series Enlisted. It later moved to 9:30 pm, swapping time slots with Enlisted. The season consisted of 22 episodes.

On March 10, 2014, Fox canceled Raising Hope. The series finale aired April 4, 2014 as the back-to-back episodes aired the night.

Cast

Main cast 
 Lucas Neff as James "Jimmy" Chance
 Martha Plimpton as Virginia Chance
 Garret Dillahunt as Burt Chance
 Shannon Woodward as Sabrina Collins
 Gregg Binkley as Barney Hughes
 Cloris Leachman as Barbara June "Maw Maw" Thompson

Recurring cast 
 Baylie and Rylie Cregut as Hope Chance (born Princess Beyonce Carlyle)
 Kate Micucci as Shelley
 Todd Giebenhain as Frank Marolla
 Carla Jimenez as Rosa Flores
 Dan Coscino as Dancin' Dan
 Eddie Steeples as Tyler, the Gas Man
 Lou Wagner as Wally Phipps

Recurring cast in flashback 
 Kelly Heyer as teenage Virginia
 Corey Eid as teenage Burt
 Trace Garcia as 6-year-old Jimmy (credited as Trace!)
 Desiree Cooper as 10-year-old Virginia

Guest cast 
 Jeffrey Tambor as Arnold
 Bernie Kopell as Charles
 Molly Shannon as Maxine
 Mindy Sterling as Prosecutor
 Diedrich Bader as Gary
 Mary Birdsong as Mayor Suzie Hellmann
 Gary Anthony Williams as Dave Davidson
 Amy Sedaris as Delilah
 Augusta Mariano as Ashley
 Lee Majors as Ralph Chance
 Shirley Jones as Christine Chance
 Brigitte Nielsen as Svetlana
 Nick Gracer as Sergei
 Jeremy Guskin as Maxim
 Keith Carradine as Colt Palomino
 Tommy Chong as Hubert
 Judith Light as Louise
 Mike O'Malley as Jim
 Michael Rapaport as Michael
 Lesley Nicol as Eleanor
 Michael Bowen as Mullet
 Kenny Loggins as Himself

Production 
On March 4, 2013, Raising Hope was renewed for a fourth season. The additional two episodes that were ordered for season three will now air as part of season four. This season was announced to premiere in late fall and air alongside the new series Enlisted, in the new timeslot of Fridays at 9:00 pm following Bones. On September 12, 2013, Fox announced that Enlisted would premiere in January instead of November and that Raising Hope would have back-to-back episodes in the fall. On October 21, 2013, FOX announced that the season premiere of Raising Hope would be delayed a week. On March 10, 2014, Fox announced that they canceled Raising Hope; making its fourth season the final season. The series finale aired April 4, 2014.

Episodes

Ratings

U.S.

References

External links 
 
 List of Raising Hope episodes at MSN TV
 List of Raising Hope episodes at The Futon Critic

2013 American television seasons
2014 American television seasons
Raising Hope